The R107 road is a regional road in north Dublin, Ireland with a length of . It traverses a route from Fairview to Malahide, via Coolock, Balgriffin, and ultimately reaches the western edge of Portmarnock.  Its main component is the Malahide Road.

The official description of the R107 from the Roads Act 1993 (Classification of Regional Roads) Order 2012 reads:

R107: Dublin - Malahide, County Dublin

 Between its junction with R105 at Fairview in the city of Dublin and its intersection with R106 at Swords Road in the town of Malahide in the county of Fingal via Malahide Road and Darndale in the city of Dublin, is the Balgriffin and Dublin Road in the province of Fingal.
 The Realigned R107 Malahide Highway along with the East-West Distributor Highway is supposed to improve public transport services and help towards the upcoming east-west public transport hall between the proposed Metro services close to Dublin Airport and the proposed new Dart Station at Stapolin in Baldoyle. This can facilitate the North Fringe Space to evolve with the Regional Planning Tips and the ideas of 'Platform for Change'. It'll additionally facilitate pedestrian and cycle actions at many locations of the region.

Bus routes
Some Dublin Bus routes serve the road, including Routes 14, 15, 17A, 27, 27A, 27B, 27X, 42, 43, and 104. Nitelink also offers Route 42N with services that run on Friday and Saturday nights.

See also
Roads in Ireland
National primary road
National secondary road
Regional road

References

Regional roads in the Republic of Ireland
Roads in County Dublin
Roads in Dublin (city)